Social Service Review is an academic journal published by the University of Chicago Press which covers social welfare policy and practice and its effects. It was established in 1927 and the editor-in-chief is Jennifer Mosley (University of Chicago).

Abstracting and indexing 
The journal is abstracted and indexed in:

According to the Journal Citation Reports, the journal has a 2021 impact factor of 1.740.

References

External links

 Social Service Review at the University of Chicago School of Social Service Administration

University of Chicago Press academic journals
Publications established in 1927
Quarterly journals
Sociology journals
English-language journals